Joe Belfiore is an American business executive who has held various roles at Microsoft since August 1990, mostly in the field of user experience. He is currently the Corporate Vice President in the Experiences and Devices division of Microsoft. A frequent speaker, Belfiore has appeared at many Microsoft conferences, often giving demos on stage. He has also hosted a TED Talk. Belfiore intends to retire from Microsoft early summer 2023.

Early life
Born in Tampa Bay, Florida, Belfiore became enamoured of computers as a child through his experience with a Timex Sinclair 1000 belonging to the father of a fellow kid in his neighborhood. He attended Clearwater Central Catholic High School and graduated in 1986. He then attended Stanford University, graduating with a bachelor's degree in computer science in 1990.

Career at Microsoft

Windows and IE user experience
Soon after graduation he was hired by Microsoft, working as Program Manager for OS/2, but his post was short-lived as Microsoft ended its partnership with IBM regarding OS/2. He moved over to the Windows NT team.

Belfiore served as user interface manager for NT during its development. In 1993 as NT shipped he joined the Windows team and became Lead Program Manager for the user interface of project Chicago, which would become Windows 95. Following this, he worked on user interface for Internet Explorer 3 and Internet Explorer 4, including IE4's Windows integrated shell. Belfiore then became manager for user experience in Windows 2000 and Windows XP, including the engineering and design team that created the Windows XP user interface.

Windows Media Center
In 2002 Belfiore joined Microsoft's new eHome division for digital home media where he initially helped with the development of Windows XP Media Center Edition. Later becoming vice president of the division, he was also responsible for design, business and marketing of Windows Media Center and related products. Belfiore successfully negotiated a deal with US cable companies to enable PCs to consume and broadcast digital TV signals around the home.

Zune
In 2008 he became corporate vice president of the Zune division.

Metro and Windows Phone
In February 2009, Belfiore moved over to the Mobile Communications Business division, which was responsible for Windows Mobile. He became Director of Program Management and his team worked on the creation of the Metro user interface in upcoming Windows Phone 7, which had influences from previous Windows Media Center design, and was rolled out to many other Microsoft products including Xbox 360 and Windows 8.

In addition he led the effort to create Cortana and many other aspects of the platform; he served as the face of the company's Windows Phone efforts.

Belfiore was forced to apologize in 2011 to unhappy Windows Phone 7 users after complaints that updates promised by Belfiore were not rolled out to users.

On October 8, 2017, in response to a Twitter question about Windows Phone, Belfiore broke Microsoft's silence about the platform by saying it will continue to be supported for bug fixes and security only, but no new features or hardware. This clarified Microsoft's position that the platform, then having fallen below 1% market share, is on end of life support amid ongoing rumors of a "Surface Phone"Surface Duo
. Media interpreted this tweet as a final confirmation that Windows Phone was "dead". In a second tweet to another user he wrote:

Operating Systems Group and Windows 10
In the summer of 2013, Belfiore was named the leader of the "PC/Tablet/Phone" vertical within the Operating Systems Group at Microsoft, responsible for delivering Windows 10 on PCs, Tablets and Phones. This group significantly updated the Windows desktop experience, owned and created the Cortana digital assistant, and created the "Continuum" feature set, which enables 2-in-1 PCs (like the Surface) to transform between "PC Mode" and "Tablet Mode"; and additionally enables Windows Phone devices to connect to a keyboard, mouse and monitor and work in a PC-like experience.

Later that year he also expanded into app development and user experience for Internet Explorer.

In Fall 2015, Belfiore announced that he would take a 9-month leave of absence from Microsoft to travel around the world with his family aboard the MV World Odyssey. While on this leave of absence, Belfiore was noted for using an iPhone, as well as a Galaxy S7, as two of his primary-use phones.

After returning from a leave-of-absence in 2016, Belfiore resumed his work on Windows 10 and announced many new features at Build 2017, including cross-platform features enabling "Windows PCs to love all your devices"—including iOS and Android phones.

Client Experience
In 2018 he headed Windows Client Experience which includes Windows shell and cross-device experiences of Microsoft Edge and Microsoft Launcher.

Office
In 2020 it was announced Belfiore will lead the Microsoft Office Experience Group, while still leading the group that involves Microsoft mobile apps for the iOS and Android platforms.

On October 27, 2022, Belfiore announced his retirement from Microsoft, to be effective early summer 2023.

Other ventures

The Game 
Belfiore is also known for being the founder of the non-stop 24- to 48-hour treasure hunt The Game, run in the San Francisco Bay and Seattle areas.

At TED 2004 in Monterey, California he delivered a TED Talk on "The Game" where he caused the cell phones of most audience members to ring, leaving them with a trail of clues to solve at the TED conference.

Seattle Sounders ownership
In August 2019, Belfiore and his wife Kristina joined the ownership group of Seattle Sounders FC, a Major League Soccer club.

Awards
His work on Windows 10 earned him kudos as Stuff magazine's #16 innovator of the year for 2015 and in May 2013, he was recognized by Business Insider as the #10 Best Designer in Technology.

Personal life
Belfiore is married to Kristina Belfiore who also graduated from Stanford in 1990 and worked at Microsoft for 32 years. They live in Bellevue, Washington and have 3 children.

References 

Microsoft employees
Living people
Stanford University alumni
Place of birth missing (living people)
Year of birth missing (living people)
OS/2 people